The first season of the Argentine telenovela Violetta started airing in Argentina on May 14, 2012 and ended on October 26, 2012. There were 80 episodes divided into two parts, each with 40 episodes. The first half of the season was titled Su destino es hoy (Her destiny is today), and the second remaining half was titled Violetta está cambiando (Violetta is changing).

Plot 

Violetta, along with her father, Germán, just got back to her hometown, Buenos Aires, after living in Europe for some years. Later, it turns out she has a passion for music, dancing and singing. But her father doesn't want her to sing after the accident that happened to her mother, Maria. She was a famous singer who died in a car accident during a tour commissioned by her father when Violetta was just five years old. 

German had moved his construction business and her (Violetta) away from Maria's father, whom German blamed for Maria's death. However, his own recent death prompts German and Violetta's return.

Now, Violetta is back in Argentina with no friends and seemingly no one who understands her until one day, in the rain, she slips and literally falls into the arms of Tomas.

With the help of her new governess, Angie (who is also secretly her aunt), Violetta enrolled at Studio 21 without her father's knowledge. There, she meets her first love, makes new friends, and meets a rival, Ludmilla. She keeps building up her musical talent day after day until the final show at the end of the year, where Angie manages to convince German, who now finally understands that singing and dancing is Violetta's passion and lets her attend Studio 21.

Cast

Main cast
 Martina Stoessel as Violetta Castillo
 Jorge Blanco as León Vargas
 Pablo Espinosa as Tomás Heredia
 Clara Alonso as Ángeles "Angie" Carrará
 Mirta Wons as Olga Patricia Peña
 Mercedes Lambre as Ludmila Ferro
 Alba Rico Navarro as Natalia Vidal
 Alfredo Allende as Lisandro Ramallo
 Facundo Gambandé as Maximiliano "Maxi" Ponte
 Florencia Benítez as Jade LaFontaine
 Lodovica Comello as Francesca Caviglia
 Joaquín Berthold as Matías LaFontaine
 Ezequiel Rodríguez as Pablo Galindo
 Candelaria Molfese as Camila Torres
 Diego Ramos as Germán Castillo
 Rodrigo Pedreira as Gregorio Casal
 Nicolás Garnier as Andrés Calixto
 Pablo Sultani as Roberto "Beto" Benvenuto
 Simone Lijoi as Luca Caviglia
 Artur Logunov as Braco
 Rodrigo Vellia as Napo
 Samuel Nascimento as Broduey
 Diego Alcalá es Marotti
 Sofía Carson es Melanie Sánchez
 Junior Losa  es Jesús Martín

Recurring cast

 Ruggero Pasquarelli as Federico
 Alberto Fernández de Rosa as Antonio Fernández Méndez
 Nilda Raggi as Angélica Carrará
 Nikole Castillo as Andrea
 Lucía Gil as Helena "Lena" Vidal
 Martín Pavlovsky as Dr. Dufré
 Diego Domínguez as Diego Hernández
 Valeria Baroni as Lara Jiménez
 xabiani ponce de leon as Marco Tavelli
 Carla Pandoffi as Esmeralda
 Valentina Frione as Jackie
 Damien Lauretta as Clement/Álex
 Macarena Miguel as Gery López
 Florencia Ortiz as Priscila Ferro
 Nacho Gadano as Nicolás Cortés
 Rodrigo Frampton as Milton Vinicíus
 Justina Bustos as Ana
 Paloma Sirven as Emma Toledo
 Luis Sabatini as Óscar Cardozo
 Sami Justo as Mara
 Guido Pennelli as Seba
 Dionisio Suarez as Dioni DJ
 Gaya Gur Arie as Libby
 Javier LQ as Felipe Díaz
 Soledad Camasco as Marcel Parodi 
 German Tripel as Rafa Palmer
 Nilda Raggi as Angelica 
 Nikola Castillo as Andrea
 Javier Nikilson Jacinto LaFontaine

Release and reception

Broadcast
The series originally ran from May 14 to October 26, 2012 on Disney Channel (Latin America). It ran from July 22, 2013 to August 28, 2014 on Disney Channel (UK and Ireland). It aired from August 26, 2013 to April 4, 2014 on Disney Channel (Europe, Middle East and Africa), The season premiered on October 18, 2013 on Disney Channel (Australia and New Zealand), and on March 3, 2014 on Disney Channel (Southeast Asia)

Ratings
In Spain, the first episode received a 3.1% share or 461,000 viewers and it has increased by 93% by the end of the first season. The series is also successful in Mexico, Colombia, and Brazil for kids aged 4–11. It's also popular online, with  YouTube visits,  official website visits, and over  Facebook visits. The first episode in Italy received 195,973 viewers making it Disney Channel's most watched broadcast in the country. The average for each episode is 200,000 viewers. The Rai Gulp premiere had a 1% share or 272,000 viewers and the second episode received 300,000 viewers or a share of 1.34%.
In the UK the show isn't very popular due to people who are unhappy with dubbed songs, but recently the score 9.5 has increased 9.8 rating and making it one of the most successful shows on Disney Channel UK.

Episodes
{| class="wikitable plainrowheaders" style="width:100%; margin:auto; background:#FFFFF;"
|- 
! scope="col" style="background:#8800C3; color:#FFF;" rowspan=2 | No. inseries 
! scope="col" style="background:#8800C3; color:#FFF;" rowspan=2 | No. inseason 
! scope="col" style="background:#8800C3; color:#FFF;" rowspan=2 | Title  
! scope="col" style="background:#8800C3; color:#FFF;" colspan=2 | Original air date
|-
! scope="col" style="background:#8800C3; color:#FFF;" | Latin America
! scope="col" style="background:#8800C3; color:#FFF;" | UK & Ireland
|-
!colspan="6;" style="background-color: #8800C3; color:#FFF;"| Su destino es hoy (in English "Her fate is now") 

|-
!colspan="5;" style="background-color: #7F1E57; color:#FFF;"| Violetta está cambiando (in English "Violetta's changing")

|}

References

Notes 

2012 Argentine television seasons